The Indian Society for Ecological Economics (INSEE) was founded in 1998 and registered as a Society under the Societies Registration Act in January 1999. Headquartered in New Delhi, this is a regional society affiliated to the International Society for Ecological Economics (ISEE). The society publishes a bi-annual, open access peer-reviewed journal Ecology, Economy and Society–The INSEE Journal, books and other materials, and holds periodic meetings and conferences to facilitate a voice for ecological economists.

The INSEE was initially presided over by Kanchan Chopra of the Institute of Economic Growth, and subsequently by C.H. Hanumantha Rao, Gopal K. Kadekodi, Narpat Singh Jodha, Jayanta Bandyopadhyay, Sudarshan Iyengar, Kanchan Chopra, Amita Shah, Sharachchandra Lele, Pranab Mukhopadhyay, K.N. Ninan, and Shreekant Gupta. The present President of INSEE is Nilanjan Ghosh.

Areas of Work 
The work of INSEE has broadly addressed issues of sustainable development, urbanization, climate change and disasters, global commons and environment. The INSEE journal and the biennial conferences have contributed significantly to the development and environment discourse in India. The conceptual approach of INSEE spans the disciplinary divide of the sub-fields of ecological economics and environmental economics and has "...remained both conceptually and methodologically open, and relatively free of this divide", from a position that does not "...typecast any specific definition of ecological economics". As noted by Ghosh and others (2016): "Ecological economics has been acknowledged by the Society to subsume the neoclassical framework of environmental economics, apart from considering the broader body of the literature emerging at the interface of economics, ecological sciences, hydrology, geology, geography, sociology, political science, anthropology etc."

Ecology, Economy and Society–The INSEE Journal 
Ecology, Economy and Society–The INSEE Journal is a bi-annual journal published by the Indian Society for Ecological Economics. The first two issues appeared in 2018 and two issues have been published each year since then. The journal today publishes papers on ecological economics, sustainable development and multi-disciplinary subjects related to ecology, economy, and society. Besides regular academic and review papers, the journal also carries book reviews and commentaries on related topics.

INSEE Conferences 
INSEE holds biennial conferences in different locations:

 Tenth INSEE Biennial Conference, 2019, CESS, Hyderabad, INSEE-CESS International Conference, "Climate Change and Disasters: Challenges, Opportunities and Responses", 6–8 November 2019
 Ninth INSEE Biennial Conference, 2017, KILA, Thrissur, "Sustainability, Institutions, Incentives: Voices, Policies and Commitments", 8–10 November 2017
 Eighth INSEE Biennial Conference, 2016, Bengaluru, "Urbanization and the Environment", 4–6 January 2016
 Seventh INSEE Biennial Conference, 2013, Guwahati, "Global Change, Ecosystems, Sustainability", 5–8 December 2013
 Sixth INSEE Biennial Conference, 2011, Hyderabad, "Nature, Economy and Society: Understanding the Linkages", 20–22 October 2011
 Fifth INSEE Biennial Conference, 2009, Ahmedabad, "Environmental Governance", 20–21 January 2009
 Fourth INSEE Biennial Conference, 2005, Mumbai, "Ecology and Human Well Being", 3–4 June 2005
 Third INSEE Biennial Conference, 2003, Mumbai, "Biodiversity and Quality of Life", 18–20 December 2003
 Second INSEE Biennial Conference, 2001, Bhopal, "Water Resources, Sustainable Livelihood and Eco-system Services", 19–21 December 2001
 First INSEE Biennial Conference, 1999, Bangalore, "Ecological Economics For Sustainable Development", 20–22 December 1999

References

External links 

 ISEE
 Ecology, Economy and Society–The INSEE Journal

Natural resources organizations
Resource economics
Environmental social science
Ecological economics
Scientific societies based in India